George Malcolm Trout (March 7, 1896 – November 1, 1990) An American dairy industry pioneer, writer, researcher, and professor emeritus in food science at Michigan State University. Trout is credited with finding the key to the creation of homogenized milk.

Biography
He was born on March 7, 1896, in Birmingham, Iowa. He received his bachelor's degree in 1923 and master's degree in 1924 from Iowa State University (ISU). Trout received a doctorate degree from Cornell University in 1936. He was on the dairy husbandry staff of the West Virginia University.

He joined Michigan State University in 1928, and became a full professor in 1941, before he retired in 1966.

He researched the homogenization of milk. In the 1930s he was considered to be a dairy industry pioneer for his research on the chemical and physical properties of homogenized milk.

The American Dairy Science Association gave him its highest award in 1964 and a further special award of appreciation in 1981 for 30 years of work as historian.

Death and legacy 
He died on November 1, 1990, at the age of 94 and is buried in Evergreen Cemetery in Lansing, Michigan.

There has been a foundation established in his name to carry on his legacy and learning, and in 1992 the Food Science Building at Michigan State University was renamed the "G. Malcolm Trout Food Science and Human Nutrition Building". In addition, the Trout Council was formed in the 1980s to help continue Dr. Trout's development projects.

Michigan Governor Blanchard honored him by designating March 7, 1986, as Mac Trout Day.

References

External links
 Trout Scholarship page at MSU

American food scientists
Iowa State University alumni
Cornell University alumni
Dairy educators
West Virginia University faculty
Michigan State University faculty
1896 births
1990 deaths
People from Birmingham, Iowa